Fayence is a commune in the Var department in the Provence-Alpes-Côte d'Azur region in Southeastern France. In 2019, it had a population of 5,735.

Fayence is one of a series of "perched villages" overlooking the plain between the southern Alps and the Esterel massif, which borders the Mediterranean Sea between Cannes and Saint-Raphaël. The village is located on the road to Mons, which later on joins the Route Napoléon linking Nice to Grenoble through the Alps.

Some high-standing resorts have settled nearby the village in the recent years: the Domaine de Terre Blanche at Tourrettes and Domaine de Fayence attract a foreign clientele. The village contains a primary school (École de la Ferrage) and a junior high school (Collège Marie Mauron). The Aérodrome de Fayence-Tourettes is one of the most active in Europe for gliding; it hosts the Provence Côte d'Azur Aeronautical Association.

History
Before and during WWII, Fayence-Tourettes Airfield was an air force base. On 13 June 1940,  12 Italian Fiat CR.42 Falcos from 151° Gruppo of 53° Stormo attacked the airfield, destroying several aircraft on the ground.

Population

See also
Communes of the Var department

References

Citations

Bibliography

 
 De Marchi, Italo. Fiat CR.42 Falco (in Italian). Modena, Italy: Stem Mucchi, 1994. No ISBN.
 Sgarlato, Nico. Fiat CR.42 (in Italian). Parma, Italy: Delta Editrice, 2005.
 Skulski, Przemysław. Fiat CR.42 Falco. Redbourn, UK: Mushroom Model Publications, 2007. .

External links
Official site of the city of Fayence (in French)
Photos of Fayence on photoenligne
Photos of Fayence on Pbase
AAPCA

Communes of Var (department)